Stainback is a surname. Notable people with the surname include:

Charles A. Stainback (c. 1879 – 1961), American lawyer and politician
George Tucker Stainback (1829–1902), American classicist and Presbyterian minister
Ingram Stainback (1883–1961), American politician
Tuck Stainback (1911–1992), American baseball player